Qullqi Hirka (Quechua qullqi silver, hirka mountain, "silver mountain", also spelled Jolgigirca) is a mountain in the Andes of Peru which reaches a height of approximately . It is located in the Junín Region, Tarma Province, Cajas District.

References 

Mountains of Peru
Mountains of Junín Region